Lubov (real name unknown) is the pseudonym of a painter (born in St. Petersburg) specializing in science fiction and fantasy art.

General information
A Chesley Award nominee, Lubov's work has appeared internationally in numerous print publications and galleries, on multiple cards for the games Magic: The Gathering and Galactic Empires, and on the covers of various books, comics, event programs, and magazines. She is also a regular guest artist and speaker at numerous science-fiction and fantasy conventions, worldwide.

Her Dungeons & Dragons work includes On Hallowed Ground.

Education
Lubov claims to have trained at the Saint Petersburg Academy of Arts in Russia, where her focus was on the classical application of oils. Seeking (she says) political and cultural freedom, she claims to have emigrated from Russia to the United States, where she says she studied at School of the Art Institute of Chicago on a four-year scholarship.

Science fiction and fantasy conventions
From 1993 to the present, Lubov's focus on the worlds of science fiction and fantasy led her to become a regular seminar speaker and/or guest artist at numerous conventions, including Westercon, Xanadu, Loscon, Demicon, LoneStarCon 2, LepreCon, Balticon, Artist Guest of Honor at Arisia '14, and others.

Awards
Lubov's work has won numerous awards in the worlds of science-fiction and fantasy.

References

External links
 Lubov website

20th-century Russian painters
21st-century Russian painters
Game artists
Living people
Pseudonymous artists
Anonymous artists
Year of birth missing (living people)
Russian women painters
Science fiction artists
Fantasy artists
Painters from Saint Petersburg
20th-century Russian women